Gol Bazu (also Romanized as Gol Bāzū; also known as Gol Bāzo) is a village in Nowsher-e Koshk-e Bijar Rural District, Khoshk-e Bijar District, Rasht County, Gilan Province, Iran. At the 2006 census, its population was 109, in 32 families.

References 

Populated places in Rasht County